Bonanza is an American western television series developed and produced by David Dortort and broadcast in the United States for 14 seasons on the NBC network. The entire run of the series' 431 hour-long episodes was produced in color. The premiere was on September 12, 1959, and the final episode broadcast on January 16, 1973. In its initial season, Bonanza aired on Saturday evenings and placed at number 45 in the Nielsen ratings. During its second season, the series moved up to number 17. Bonanza was moved to Sundays at 9:00 PM Eastern Time at the start of its third season. In that time slot, the ratings soared and the series become second only to Wagon Train as the most popular program on American prime time television. It remained in the top ten of the ratings through its twelfth season and ranked at number one in its sixth, seventh, and eighth seasons. Bonanza also became a worldwide success as it was broadcast in nearly 50 countries, including Canada, Brazil, Yugoslavia, the United Kingdom, France, Italy, Switzerland, Saudi Arabia, Thailand, Australia, and Japan.

Bonanza is set around the Ponderosa Ranch near Virginia City, Nevada and chronicles the weekly adventures of the Cartwright family, consisting of Ben Cartwright (Lorne Greene) and his three sons (each by a different wife), Adam (Pernell Roberts), Eric "Hoss" (Dan Blocker), and Joseph (Michael Landon). Veteran actor Victor Sen Yung played the ranch cook, Hop Sing. In 1964, Pernell Roberts began expressing a desire to leave the series, and so prospective replacements were introduced via Barry Coe as Little Joe's wayward maternal half-brother Clay, and Guy Williams as Ben's nephew Will Cartwright. However, Roberts was persuaded to complete his contract, and remained through season six. The characters of Clay and Will were discontinued. In the ninth season, David Canary was added to the cast as ranch hand/foreman Candy Canady. After four years with the series, Canary left due to a contract dispute. In the twelfth season, Mitch Vogel joined the cast as Jamie Hunter, a teenage orphan who is adopted by Ben Cartwright. Following Dan Blocker's death in May 1972 after season thirteen ended, Greene, Landon, and Vogel continued the series into a fourteenth season, with Canary returning as Candy (reportedly approached by Landon) and Tim Matheson was introduced as ex-prisoner and newly hired ranch-hand Griff King. The program was moved to Tuesday nights where it slipped badly in the ratings to number 52 and was subsequently cancelled. Bonanza has, however, continued to be popular in syndication. From 1964–1967, " Bonanza " became the most watched show in the U.S.

The first eleven seasons have been released on DVD in Region 1.

Series overview

Episodes

Season 1 (1959–60)

Season 2 (1960–61)

Season 3 (1961–62)

Season 4 (1962–63)

Season 5 (1963–64)

Season 6 (1964–65)

Season 7 (1965–66)

Season 8 (1966–67)

Season 9 (1967–68)

Season 10 (1968–69)

Season 11 (1969–70)

Season 12 (1970–71)

Season 13 (1971–72)

Season 14 (1972–73)

TV movies

TV movies and prequel series
In 1988, NBC revived Bonanza with the television film Bonanza: The Next Generation. Lorne Greene, who was to have reprised his role as Ben Cartwright, died before production began, and was replaced by John Ireland as Ben's brother, Aaron Cartwright. Michael Landon Jr. played the role of Little Joe's son, Benjamin Cartwright. Landon Jr. again played Benjamin Cartwright in a second television film Bonanza: The Return. Dirk Blocker, the son of Dan Blocker, played a supporting role in this film which, in its original broadcast on November 28, 1993, was preceded by Back to Bonanza, a one-hour special devoted to the original series. A third TV movie, Bonanza: Under Attack, aired January 15, 1995. Landon Jr. also starred in this film.

In 2001–2002, a "prequel" series, Ponderosa, aired on the PAX-TV network. Set 10 years prior to the first season, it starred Daniel Hugh Kelly as Ben Cartwright, Matt Carmody as Adam, Drew Powell as Hoss, and Jared Daperis as Little Joe.

See also 
 Bonanza accolades

References
Footnotes

Bibliography

External links
 
 Bonanza World
 Bonanza on TVLand.com
 Bonanza at Fiftiesweb.com
 Bonanza at EpisodeWorld.com
 Bonanza: Scenery of The Ponderosa
 Season 1 DVD review and production history

Lists of American action television series episodes
Lists of American Western (genre) television series episodes
Bonanza